An Exultet roll is a long and wide illuminated scroll containing the text and music of the Exultet, the liturgical chant for the Paschal vigil. The material was usually parchment, the layout that of a rotulus (text parallel to the rod), the text in Beneventan script and the music notated in neumes. The illustrations were often upside down relative to the text. As the text was read by the officiant and the scroll unrolled over the pulpit (ambo), the images would appear right-side up to the congregation. The form was peculiar to southern Italy, mainly the area around Benevento and Montecassino, and the surviving examples date from between the 10th and 13th centuries.

The Exultet roll takes its name from the opening words of the chant in Latin: Exultet iam angelica turba coelorum ('Let the angelic host of heaven exult'). These words were sung by the deacon during the blessing and lighting of the Paschal candle at the Midnight Mass. The chant included prayers, canticles and lections. Although based on the Pontifical liturgy, the form of the ceremony and the Exultet as practised in southern Italy is attributed to Archbishop Landulf I of Benevento. It spread throughout southern Italy largely through the influence of the abbey of Montecassino.

Outside of their one annual liturgical function, Exultet rolls were objects of display. They featured initials decorated with interlace in a distinct Beneventan style and miniatures in a "Byzantinizing" style. The luxurious miniatures are among the largest found in European manuscripts up to that time.

Gallery

Notes

Bibliography

Types of illuminated manuscript
Christian literary genres